Gallop Racer 2006, known in Japan as , is a horse racing video game developed and published by Tecmo, released in 2005-2006 for the PlayStation 2.

Reception

The game received "average" reviews according to the review aggregation website Metacritic. In Japan, Famitsu gave it a score of two eights and two sevens for a total of 30 out of 40.

References

External links
 

2005 video games
Arcade video games
Horse racing video games
Koei Tecmo franchises
PlayStation 2 games
PlayStation 2-only games
Tecmo games
Video game sequels
Video games developed in Japan
Video games set in 2006
Multiplayer and single-player video games